Tideman's Alternative Methods, including Alternative Smith and Alternative Schwartz, are two electoral systems developed by Nicolaus Tideman which select a single winner using votes that express preferences.  These methods can also create a sorted list of winners.

These methods are Smith- and Schwartz-efficient, respectively, and thus are Condorcet methods. They operate by using instant-runoff voting for cycle resolution.

Procedure 

Tideman's Alternative procedure is as follows:
 Identify the Smith or Schwartz set.
 If the set consists of one candidate, elect that candidate.
 Eliminate all candidates outside the set and redistribute ballots.
 Eliminate the plurality loser.
 Repeat the procedure.

To create a sorted list of preferred candidates, select a winner, remove that winner from the list of candidates, and repeat.

Features 
Tideman's Alternative Methods are easier to understand than other methods, such as Ranked Pairs and Schulze, owing to the simplicity of explaining both the Smith set (the smallest set of all candidates who each defeat every non-Smith candidate) and Instant run-off voting (eliminating the candidate with the fewest votes).  This increases the likelihood of voter acceptance.

This method strongly resists both tactical voting and tactical nomination, reducing the amount of political manipulation possible or favorable in large elections.  They inherit this resistance from instant run-off voting, as both methods resolve a Condorcet winner from the Smith set by eliminating non-Smith (or non-Schwartz) candidates and performing instant run-off voting on the result.

Although IRV itself faces criticism for theoretical and historical failures, all Smith- and Schwartz-efficient voting methods attempt to resolve a candidate from these respective sets.  Unlike IRV, these methods invariably elect a Condorcet winner; when there is none, they elect different winners based on arbitrary criteria.  Ranked Pairs elects the winner with the strongest overall ranking, while the Schulze method attempts to elect a winner without the worst pairwise loss.  Tideman's Alternative Method elects a candidate in a manner strongly resisting tactical nomination and voting.

Tideman's Alternative Methods fail independence of irrelevant alternatives. However, the methods adhere to a less strict property, sometimes called independence of Smith-dominated alternatives (ISDA). It says that if one candidate (X) wins an election, and a new alternative (Y) is added, X will win the election if Y is not in the Smith set. ISDA implies the Smith criterion and Condorcet criterion.

Note that the Condorcet winner can be used as the "set" (if there is a Condorcet winner, they are the only member of the set. Otherwise, all candidates are in the set). This variation is known as Benham's method.

Comparison table 
The following table compares Tideman's Alternative Methods with other preferential single-winner election methods:

References 

 Green-Armytage, James. Four Condorcet-Hare Hybrid Methods for Single-Winner Elections.

Non-monotonic Condorcet methods
Single-winner electoral systems